Uwe Pfeifer (born 14 February 1947) is a German painter and graphic artist.

Life and achievement
Born in Halle, Pfeifer learnt window dressing after his Abitur. From 1968 to 1973 he studied at the Hochschule für Grafik und Buchkunst Leipzig with Werner Tübke, Hans Mayer-Foreyt and Wolfgang Mattheuer. After his studies he returned to his hometown and got a teaching position for lithography at the art academy Burg Giebichenstein in 1975. In 1982 his work was presented in the DEFA documentary .

References

External links 
 
 Hallescher Kunstpreis 2009:Uwe Pfeifer. Hallescher Kunstverein
 Uwe Pfeifer (1947). Museum junge Kunst, Frankfurt (Oder)
 Uwe Pfeifer Galerie Supper
 Pfeifer Uwe on ZVAB

1947 births
Living people
People from Halle (Saale)
20th-century German printmakers
Hochschule für Grafik und Buchkunst Leipzig alumni